The Yanmaodao is a type of dao used as a standard military weapon during the Ming Dynasty and middle Qing Dynasty (1368–1800). The blade is straight until the curve begins around the center of percussion along the last 1/4 or so of the blade approaching the tip. The center of percussion is the point on the blade with the least vibration on hard contact, the spot on the blade that transmits the most power to the target in a hard chop. This allows for thrusting attacks and overall handling similar to that of the jian, while still preserving much of the dao's strengths in cutting and slashing. This type of sword seems to have lost its popularity with military and martial arts practitioners alike by the end of the 18th century.

Yanmaodao almost invariably have straight grips, although downward-curved handles are depicted in Ming artwork. During the last century of Qing rule, curved grips became far more prevalent than straight.

Notes and references

Tom, Philip with Scott M. Rodell (February 2005). "An Introduction to Chinese Single-Edged Hilt Weapons (Dao) and Their Use in the Ming and Qing Dynasties". Kung Fu Tai Chi, pp. 76–85

External links
http://www.mandarinmansion.com/content/geese-and-willows-yanmaodao-and-liuyedao

Chinese swords
Blade weapons